Ronan Sweeney (born 15 September 1980) is a Gaelic footballer, who played inter-county football for Kildare and currently plays club football with Moorefield. He played for Kildare for 13 seasons between 2000 - 2013 winning a Leinster title in 2000 after defeating Dublin. 
He has been very influential in his club's most successful ever period, winning 9 county championships and 2 Leinster titles between 2000 and 2018.

Sweeney has been heavily involved in the Gaelic Players Association from a young age and became secretary for a period of time.

Honours
Kildare Senior Football Championship (9): 2000, 2002, 2006, 2007, 2010, 2013, 2014, 2017, 2018
Leinster Senior Club Football Championship (2): 2006, 2017
Leinster Club Footballer of the Year (1): 2006
Leinster Senior Football Championship (1): 2000
National Football League Division 2 (1):

Coaching
Sweeney went straight from playing inter county football to coaching when he joined Niall Carew's backroom team in Waterford in 2013 and Sligo in 2014 and 2015. He then became head coach with his home county Kildare for 2 years in 2016 and 2017 under current manager, Cian O'Neil.

References

1980 births
Living people
Kildare inter-county Gaelic footballers